Frank Joseph Pellegrino (May 19, 1944 – January 31, 2017) was an American actor and restaurateur.

Early life and education
Born in East Harlem on May 19, 1944, to father Frank, a truck driver, and mother, Ida (née Puccillo), a seamstress, Pellegrino graduated from Oceanside High School and Pace College (now Pace University).

Career
Pellegrino has often acted in law and gangster-themed film and television productions. He was a member of an early 1960s singing group called the Holidaes. Notable acting roles include Johnny Dio in Goodfellas, assorted appearances on Dick Wolf's Law & Order, and FBI Chief Frank Cubitoso on The Sopranos.

Pellegrino was a co-owner of the restaurant Rao's in New York City. Books written by Pellegrino include Rao's Cookbook, Rao's Recipes from the Neighborhood and Rao's on the Grill. He also produced the CD An Evening at Rao's, featuring music from Rao's jukebox.

Death
Pellegrino died from lung cancer on January 31, 2017 in Manhattan. He was 72.

Filmography

Film

Television

References

External links

1944 births
2017 deaths
American people of Italian descent
American restaurateurs
Male actors from New York City
Deaths from lung cancer in New York (state)
People from East Harlem
Pace University alumni
American cookbook writers